Kanjur in Iran may refer to:
 Kanjur-e Olya
 Kanjur-e Sofla